Antonio Salines (1 July 1936 – 22 June 2021) was an Italian actor and director.

Biography
Born in La Spezia, the son of the composer Enrico, at ten years old Salines started his career as a child actor, appearing in several stage works in the theatrical company of Franco Sportelli. 
In 1959 he graduated from the Silvio D'Amico Academy of Dramatic Arts in Rome, and in 1960 he entered the stage company of Vittorio Gassman. Alongside a busy career on stage, Salines has appeared in a large number of television movies and series and in several films. Salines was also a stage director, and in 1991 he directed the film Zio Vanja, based on Anton Chekhov's Uncle Vanya. He was married to the actress Flavia Milante. Salines died in Rome on 22 June 2021, at the age of 84.

Filmography 
 Sierra Maestra (1969) - Franco
 Matalo! (1970) - Ted
 La stirpe di Caino (1971)
 Non ho tempo (1973)
 The Gamecock (1974) - Carlo Amatriciani
 Liebeskonzil (1982) - Teufel / Dr. Panizza
 Un marziano a Roma (1983)
 Zio Vania di Anton Cechov (1990) - Ivan Petrovich Voinitsky (Uncle Vanya)
 The Voyeur (1994) - Doctor
 Monella (1998) - Pepè
 Trasgredire (2000)
 Sister Smile (2001) - Vitale
 Senso '45 (2002) - Carlo
 Fallo! (2003) - Mr. Noel (episode "Honni soit qui mal y pense" in Cap d'Agde)
 Terapia Roosevelt (2006)
 I nostri ragazzi (2014)
 Spectre (2015) - Fiat Driver
 Los Feliz (2016) - Cardinal 1
 Happy as Lazzaro (2018) - Nicola anziano

References

External links 
 

1936 births
2021 deaths
Italian male film actors
Italian male stage actors
Italian male television actors
People from La Spezia
20th-century Italian male actors
Accademia Nazionale di Arte Drammatica Silvio D'Amico alumni
Italian theatre directors